Edith Louise Master (August 25, 1932 – August 18, 2013) was a Jewish-American equestrian.

Early life
She was born in New York, New York.  She studied at Cornell University and New York University.

Career
At the 1976 Olympics, her third Olympics, she won a bronze medal in team dressage, becoming the second-oldest US female to win an Olympic medal in any sport.

See also
List of select Jewish equestrians

References

External links
Edith Master's profile at Sports Reference.com
Edith Master's obituary

1932 births
2013 deaths
Equestrians at the 1968 Summer Olympics
Equestrians at the 1972 Summer Olympics
Equestrians at the 1976 Summer Olympics
American female equestrians
American dressage riders
Olympic bronze medalists for the United States in equestrian
Jewish American sportspeople
Cornell University alumni
New York University alumni
Medalists at the 1976 Summer Olympics
21st-century American Jews
21st-century American women